Broadhaugh is a hamlet in the Scottish Borders area of Scotland, in the parish of Teviothead, in former Roxburghshire.

See also
List of places in the Scottish Borders
List of places in Scotland

Sources
Williamson, May G. (1942) The Non-Celtic Place-Names of the Scottish Border Counties, unpublished PhD thesis. University of Edinburgh.

External links

RCAHMS record for Broadhaugh
CANMORE/RCAHMS record for Broadhaugh Hill

Villages in the Scottish Borders